Thamarakkulam Municipality, also known as the Lotus City, is a municipality in the town of Tiruvannamalai in Tamil Nadu, India. Thamaraikulam is not under the legal jurisdiction of Tiruvannamalai. The municipal antacutu ("status") is separate from the "census town".

Villages in Tiruvannamalai district
Cities and towns in Tiruvannamalai district